Kalateh Khij (also Romanized as Kalāteh Khīj, Kalāteh-ye Khīj, and Kalāteh-i-Khīj; also known as Kalāteh Khonj) is a city in Bastam District, Shahrud County, Semnan Province, Iran. At the 2006 census, its population was 5,335, in 1,447 families.

References

Populated places in Shahrud County

Cities in Semnan Province